The 2010 NC State Wolfpack Football Team represented North Carolina State University in the 2010 NCAA Division I FBS football season.  The Wolfpack, led by head coach Tom O'Brien, played their home games at Carter–Finley Stadium in Raleigh, North Carolina and were members of the Atlantic division of the Atlantic Coast Conference. They finished the season 9–4, 5–3 in ACC play. They were invited to the Champ Sports Bowl where they defeated West Virginia, 23–7.

Schedule

References

NC State
NC State Wolfpack football seasons
Cheez-It Bowl champion seasons
NC State Wolfpack football